This is a list of protected areas of Ontario that are administered by Government of Ontario. Ontario Parks and the Ministry of the Environment, Conservation and Parks are the provincial bodies responsible for managing these protected areas.

Types
There are four main types of protected areas in Ontario:
 Provincial parks: Areas containing significant natural and cultural features, and provide opportunities for outdoor recreation, scientific research and environmental monitoring, and education. Provincial parks are further subdivided into six classes:
 Cultural Heritage Class Parks: Parks to protect cultural heritage elements that are distinct in Ontario for intrinsic value, interpretation, education and research purposes.
 Natural Environment Class Parks: Parks to protect provincially significant recreational landscapes and representative ecosystems, as well as to provide recreational and educational experiences.
 Nature Reserve Class Parks: Parks to protect notable and provincially significant natural habitats, landforms and ecosystems for intrinsic value, scientific research and biodiversity purposes.
 Recreation Class Parks: Parks to provide a variety of outdoor recreation opportunities in natural surroundings.
 Waterway Class Parks: Parks to protect recreational water routes and provincially significant terrestrial and aquatic ecosystems to provide recreational and educational experiences. 
 Wilderness Class Parks: Parks to protect large areas for nature, and provide low-impact recreation. Visitors must travel through these parks by foot only.
 Conservation Reserves: Areas containing significant natural and cultural features, and provide opportunities compatible traditional activities such as fishing, hunting, and trapping. Scientific research and environmental monitoring also occurs.
 Wilderness Areas: Areas preserved to maintain their natural state, and protect flora and fauna. Research and educational activities can occur.
 Dedicated Protected Areas: Areas identified by First Nations and the Government of Ontario through community-based land use planning in the Far North area of the province. These areas protect the unique ecology and boreal environment of the region, and allow development of resources.

Lists of parks and protected areas

Provincial parks

Conservation reserves

Dedicated protected areas

Wilderness areas

See also
List of botanical gardens in Canada
List of Canadian protected areas

References
General
 
 
 
 

Specific

External links

Ontario Parks official site
Parks Canada official site

 
Ontario
Protected areas